Rock 'N' Roll Cowboys is a 1988 Australian television film about a roadie.

References

External links
Rock N Roll Cowboys at IMDb
Blog review

Australian television films
1980s English-language films
1988 films
1988 television films
1980s Australian films